Glutinous rice ball may refer to:

Tangyuan (food), a Chinese glutinous rice ball cooked in boiling water
Lo mai chi, a Chinese glutinous rice pastry
Gyeongdan, a Korean glutinous rice cake

See also
Rice ball